is a district located in Saga Prefecture, Japan.

As of February 1, 2009, the district has an estimated population of 45,085 and a density of 318 persons per km2. The total area is 135.40 km2.

Municipalities
Kōhoku
Ōmachi
Shiroishi

History

Districts in Saga Prefecture